Great Wheel Corporation was a company engaged in the development, building, financing, and operation of Ferris wheels, which they often termed "observation wheels" or "observation platforms".

Great Wheel Corporation, registered in Singapore as GWC Holdings, was a consultant for the  Singapore Flyer, the world's tallest Ferris wheel since it was completed in 2008. Florian Bollen was chairman of both Great Wheel Corporation and Singapore Flyer Pte Ltd. The Singapore Flyer went into receivership in May 2013.

In 2009, Great Wheel Corporation merged with World Tourist Attractions to form Great City Attractions. World Tourist Attractions went into administration in December 2010, followed by Great City Attractions in July 2012.

In May 2010, Great Wheel Corporation was one of several companies named in a report lodged with the prosecutor's office in Berlin, Germany, for alleged embezzlement.

History
In 2009, World Tourist Attractions had merged with Great Wheel Corporation to form Great City Attractions, said at that time to be "the world's largest operator of Observation Wheels."

On 23 December 2010, the holding company WTA Global Holdings, which traded as World Tourist Attractions, went into administration, having hit financial difficulties due to the seasonal nature of its trade. At that time, it was operating five large transportable wheels in the UK, in Dublin, Liverpool, Manchester, Weston Super-Mare, and Hyde Park in London. Some proved not to be viable during the off-season, while others simply failed to make the profits initially predicted. The company collapsed owing £16.4 million, including £8.9 million to unsecured creditors, who were expected to get nothing.

Early in 2011 the assets of WTA Global Holdings were bought out of administration for £230,000 by Great City Attractions, operating as a subsidiary of Elliot Hall Ltd, a new company set up by WTA Global Holdings director Elliot Hall.

In July 2012 it was reported that Great City Attractions had also gone into administration. It ceased trading the following month.

In May 2013 the Singapore Flyer went into receivership, and accountants Ferrier Hodgson were appointed as receiver and manager of the company's charged assets.

Unbuilt projects
Great Wheel Corporation was involved in a number of giant Ferris wheel projects, all of which failed either prior to, or very shortly after, the start of construction.

References

Entertainment companies of Singapore